Biaza is a rural locality (a selo) in Severny District, Novosibirsk Oblast, Russia. Population:

References

Notes

Sources

Rural localities in Novosibirsk Oblast